"Cheated Hearts" is a single by New York-based alternative rock band Yeah Yeah Yeahs. It is taken from their second album Show Your Bones. The song was first released as a live performance from their DVD, Tell Me What Rockers to Swallow in 2004, but was released as a single two years thereafter. The track was voted the 10th best song of 2006 by NME. Despite this, it didn't chart in any major market.

Its video was made by pasting images of different videos made for this song made by fans of all around the world, who filmed themselves making an imitation of the band.

The song was listed as the 326th best song of the 2000s by Pitchfork Media.

Track listing

Heart-Shaped 7"
 "Cheated Hearts" (Radio Edit) – 3:34
 "Cheated Hearts" (Peaches Remix) – 5:13

UK Digital Single
 "Cheated Hearts" (Radio Edit) – 3:34
 "Thank You Were Wrong" – 6:10

References

External links

Yeah Yeah Yeahs songs
2006 singles
2006 songs
Polydor Records singles
Songs written by Karen O
Songs written by Brian Chase
Songs written by Nick Zinner